Zhanxi Town is an urban town in Taojiang County, Hunan Province, People's Republic of China.

Administrative division
Zhanxi is divided into ten villages: Zhanxi Village, Jiuluofang Village, Wujiazhou Village, Yangquanwan Village, Changtianfang Village, Quanshuijing Village, Shuangtang Village, Weihong Village, Baishazhou Village, and Shamu Village (沾溪村、九螺坊村、伍家洲村、洋泉湾村、长田坊村、泉水井村、双塘村、卫红村、白沙洲村、杉木村).

References

External links

Divisions of Taojiang County